Pak Se-yong (7 July 1902 – 28 February 1989) was a North Korean poet and politician, best known for writing the lyrics of "Aegukka", the national anthem of North Korea.

Early life
Pak was a native of Dumo-ri, Outer old Seoul in what is now Seongdong-gu, Seoul, South Korea. When he was in his third year in Paichai High School, made a Doujinshi Saenuri(New world) that was shared among people who shared his dreams as a person involved in literature, and after graduating he enrolled in Yeonhi professional school (Modern day Yonsei University) but he soon dropped out and studied in Shanghai. In Shanghai, he worked as the china correspondent for Yeomgunsa (焰群社), a socialist cultural organization that was formed in Korea by song young lee ho and lee jeok hyo, whose aim was to research and distribute culture that liberates the proletariat. Eventually, after joining the Korean Artists’ Proletarian Federation in 1925, he started writing progressive poetry. From 1923 to 1943, he edited the youth magazine byeolnara with his comrades, and released children's novels and reiews as part of the youth literature movement, and he produced his first collection of poems called Sanjebi. Post 1945, his work began to have a realist trend. In 1946, he crossed over to the Soviet-controlled northern half of the Korean Peninsula, allegedly as a result of the foreign occupation of the south, shattering his hopes.

In politics
Pak became involved in North Korean politics from the country's earliest days. In 1948, he became a member of the Supreme People's Assembly. In May 1954, he was named a member of the central committee of the General League of Culture and Art. In October 1956, he was elevated to the standing committee of the Writers League. In 1961, he became a member of the central committee of the newly created Committee for the Peaceful Reunification of the Fatherland.

Poetry
Pak finished writing the lyrics of "Aegukka" in June 1947. Other representative works of his include the lyric poems "The sunrise at Poch'onbo" (1962), "History of Millim" (1962), and "When a fire is lit in the heart" (1963). His other famous song was The Glorious Motherland.

See also

Baek Seok
Cho Ki-chon
Jang Jin-sung
Kim Won-gyun

References

1902 births
1989 deaths
North Korean male poets
People from Seoul
20th-century North Korean poets
National anthem writers
20th-century male writers
Members of the 1st Supreme People's Assembly
South Korean emigrants to North Korea